The gens Ticinia was an obscure plebeian family at ancient Rome.  Almost no members of this gens are mentioned in history, but a few are known from inscriptions.

Origin
Here the root seems to be Ticinus, presumably referring to an inhabitant of Ticinum in Gallia Narbonensis.

Members

 Publius Ticinius Mela, brought the first barber to Rome from Sicily circa 300 BC.
 Ticinius, dedicated a family sepulchre at Savaria in Pannonia Superior, dating from the latter half of the second century, for his wife, Ticinia [...]nia.
 Ticinia [...]nia, buried at Savaria in a family sepulchre built by her husband, Ticinius, dating from the latter half of the second century.

Undated Ticinii
 Marcus Ticinius, described in an inscription from Turris Libisonis in Sardinia as procurator, or governor of the province, in an unknown year.  However, the inscription is thought to be a forgery.
 Ticinius Victor, buried at the site of modern Esnakit, formerly part of Africa Proconsularis, aged seventy.

See also
 List of Roman gentes

References

Bibliography
 Marcus Terentius Varro, Rerum Rusticarum (Rural Matters).
 Gaius Plinius Secundus (Pliny the Elder), Historia Naturalis (Natural History).
 Theodor Mommsen et alii, Corpus Inscriptionum Latinarum (The Body of Latin Inscriptions, abbreviated CIL), Berlin-Brandenburgische Akademie der Wissenschaften (1853–present).
 George Davis Chase, "The Origin of Roman Praenomina", in Harvard Studies in Classical Philology, vol. VIII, pp. 103–184 (1897).
 Bulletin Archéologique du Comité des Travaux Historiques et Scientifiques (Archaeological Bulletin of the Committee on Historic and Scientific Works, abbreviated BCTH), Imprimerie Nationale, Paris (1885–1973).

Roman gentes